"Giving You Up" is a song by Australian singer Kylie Minogue for her third greatest hits album Ultimate Kylie (2004). The song was first released as the album's second and final single on 28 March 2005. It was written by Miranda Cooper, Brian Higgins, Tim Powell, Lisa Cowling, Paul Woods, Nick Coler, and Minogue, while production was by Higgens and Xenomania. The song is a dance-pop track, which features instrumentation of synthesizers and keyboards. The track was her last solo single before she was diagnosed with breast cancer two months later; her next single was "2 Hearts" in 2007.

"Giving You Up" received mixed reviews from music critics, who complimented Minogue's vocals but dismissed the production and composition. It peaked inside the top ten in both Australia and the United Kingdom, and also charted in Austria, Belgium, Denmark, and Finland. Alex and Martin commissioned the accompanying music video for the single, which shows Minogue as a giantess and walking around the streets of London. "Giving You Up" has only been performed on her Showgirl: The Greatest Hits Tour in 2005.

Background and composition
In August 2004, it was announced that Minogue would be recording new tracks, rumored to be some kind of Christmas material. The month after, it was announced that the artist would be releasing a greatest hits album, titled Ultimate Kylie, containing two new tracks, being "I Believe in You" and "Giving You Up"; Jake Shears and Babydaddy were in charge of the production of the former, whilst the latter was produced by Brian Higgins and Xenomania. A separate compilation DVD with the same name, containing several music videos by the singer, was also released to coincide with the distribution of the album. In the same statement, it was announced that "I Believe in You" would be the lead single from the compilation.

"Giving You Up" was released digitally as the second single from Ultimate Kylie on 25 March 2005. Three days later, it was released physically in the United Kingdom. It was released as a limited edition vinyl single in the United Kingdom. In Australia, the CD single was released on 11 April 2005 and was limited to 25,000 copies. All formats feature the B-side "Made of Glass", which was written by Minogue and Xenomania during the recording sessions for Ultimate Kylie in 2004. It was also recorded by British recording artist Rachel Stevens but was never released.

"Giving You Up" was written and recorded during mid-2004 in London, England by Minogue and Xenomania. It was the third new song recorded for the compilation; the other two were "I Believe in You" and "Loving You", with the latter being cut from the album.

Reception

"Giving You Up" received mixed reviews from pop music critics. In a review for About.com, Jason Shawahn called the song "a sultry little throbber" and wrote that its "Minogue at her best". Chris Taylor from MusicOMH was less impressed, and wrote that the song was "not one of Kylie's most inspired singles". Pitchfork reviewer Nick Sylvester called the song "a return to big sound Fever electro, but with subtler production: all the hacksaw synth is pushed back and sanded off, so Kylie's head voice doesn't have to go through eight additional filters to compete with the bristle".

"Giving You Up" entered at number eight on the Australian Singles Chart. It lasted seven weeks in the top fifty. It entered the Spanish Singles Chart at number seven, and peaked at six the following week. It lasted six weeks in the chart. The song entered the UK Singles Chart at number six and lasted ten weeks in the top 100. It reached number 137 in the Annual UK Singles Chart of 2005. "Giving You Up" entered and peaked at number twenty on the Irish Singles Chart. The song reached the top forty in other territories in Europe, including Finland, Belgium, Germany, Netherlands, and Switzerland. The song reached number 13 on the European Hot 100 Singles chart.

Music video
The music video for "Giving You Up" was directed by Alex and Martin and filmed in February 2005 in London, England. The video features Minogue as a 17-foot tall, vampy, blonde giantess roaming through the streets and clubs of London at night. There are three sequences; the first features Minogue walking through a tunnel, the second of her walking through the streets and the third of her in a club. Throughout the video Minogue meets several people. In a sequence on the streets, she dances in front of a taxi cab that has stopped to let her across a zebra crossing. Minogue then heads to a club where she meets a shy man who is interested in her. In another scene on the streets, Minogue walks past three men, and begins to dance and sing to them.

The video premiered in February 2005 and was released commercially on the song's CD single. In 2006, the video was nominated for "Best International Video" at the 15th Annual MVPA Awards.

Live performances
"Giving You Up" has only been performed on her Showgirl: The Greatest Hits Tour in 2005. The song was used at the first segment, which features her in a blue showgirl costume with a blue headdress. The performance is supported by back-up dancers wearing green showgirl and showboy costumes. Minogue was unable to complete the tour as she was diagnosed with early breast cancer and had to cancel the Australian leg of the tour. The performance of the song was included in the Showgirl video album (2005).

Formats and track listings

 Australian and New Zealand maxi-CD single
 "Giving You Up" – 3:31
 "Made of Glass" (Kylie Minogue, Miranda Cooper, Brian Higgins, Lisa Cowling, Tim Powell, Matt Gray)  – 3:12
 "Giving You Up" (Riton Re-Rub vox) – 6:32
 "Giving You Up" (Alter Ego dub) – 6:31
 "Giving You Up" (enhanced video)

 UK CD1
 "Giving You Up" (original) – 3:31
 "Giving You Up" (Alter Ego dub) – 6:31
 "Giving You Up" (Riton Re-Rub vox) – 6:32
 "Giving You Up" (video)

 UK CD2 and European CD single
 "Giving You Up" (original)  – 3:31
 "Made of Glass" – 3:11

 UK 12-inch picture disc
A1. "Giving You Up" (Riton Re-Rub dub) – 6:32
B1. "Giving You Up" (original) – 3:31
B2. "Giving You Up" (Alter Ego remix) – 6:33

 European maxi-CD single
 "Giving You Up" (original) – 3:32
 "Your Disco Needs You" (German Almighty radio edit) – 3:29
 "Your Disco Needs You" (video)

 Digital EP
 "Giving You Up" – 3:30
 "Giving You Up" (Alter Ego mix) – 6:33
 "Giving You Up" (Riton Re-Rub vox) – 4:12
 "Giving You Up" (Riton Re-Rub dub) – 6:32
 "Made of Glass" – 3:15

Personnel
Personnel are lifted from the Ultimate Kylie liner notes.
 Kylie Minogue – lead vocals
 Xenomania – production
 Tim Powell – keyboards, programming, mixing
 Brian Higgins – production, keyboards, programming
 Paul Woods – keyboards, programming
 Jeremy Wheatley – mixing
 Ashley Phase – mastering

Charts

Weekly charts

Year-end charts

Release history

References

2004 songs
2005 singles
Kylie Minogue songs
Festival Records singles
Parlophone singles
Song recordings produced by Xenomania
Songs written by Nick Coler
Songs written by Miranda Cooper
Songs written by Lisa Cowling
Songs written by Brian Higgins (producer)
Songs written by Kylie Minogue
Songs written by Tim Powell (producer)